David Stokes was an English professional footballer who made over 380 appearances in the Football League for Bolton Wanderers as an outside forward. He represented the Football League XI.

Personal life
Stokes was the uncle of footballer Ray Westwood and was grand uncle to footballer Duncan Edwards.

Honours 
Bolton Wanderers

 Football League Second Division: 1908–09
 Football League Second Division promotion (2): 1904–05, 1910–11

Career statistics

References

English footballers
Brierley Hill Alliance F.C. players
Bolton Wanderers F.C. players
Darwen F.C. players
English Football League players
English Football League representative players
People from Kingswinford
Association football outside forwards
1880 births
Year of death missing
Halesowen Town F.C. players
Wolverhampton Wanderers F.C. players
FA Cup Final players